Iker Kortajarena Canellada (born 21 June 2000) is a Spanish professional footballer who plays as an attacking midfielder for Real Sociedad C.

Club career
Born in Oiartzun, Gipuzkoa, Basque Country, Kortajarena was a Real Sociedad youth graduate. He made his senior debut with the C-team on 16 February 2019, coming on as a second-half substitute for Daniel Garrido in a 0–0 Tercera División home draw against SD Beasain.

Kortajarena scored his first senior goal on 13 April 2019, netting the C's fourth in a 4–1 home routing of Pasaia KE. During the 2020–21 campaign, he scored nine goals as the C-side achieved promotion to Segunda División RFEF.

Kortajarena made his professional debut with the reserves on 4 September 2021, coming on as a second-half substitute for Luca Sangalli in a 0–1 away loss against FC Cartagena in the Segunda División championship.

References

External links

2000 births
Living people
Sportspeople from Gipuzkoa
Spanish footballers
Association football midfielders
Segunda División players
Tercera División players
Real Sociedad C footballers
Real Sociedad B footballers
Segunda Federación players
People from Oiartzun
Footballers from the Basque Country (autonomous community)